The 1995 Armenian Cup was the fourth edition of the Armenian Cup, a football competition. In 1995, the tournament had 18 participants, of which only one was a reserve team.

Results

Preliminary round

The matches were played on 5 March 1995.

|}

First round

|}

Quarter-finals

The first legs were played on 4 April 1995. The second legs were played on 13 and 14 April 1995.

|}

Semi-finals

The first legs were played on 5 May 1995. The second legs were played on 14 May 1995.

|}

Final

See also
 1995 Armenian Premier League

External links
 1995 Armenian Cup at rsssf.com

Armenian Cup seasons
Armenia
Armenian Cup, 1995